The Phantom Chance (foaled 3 November 1989) is a New Zealand Thoroughbred racehorse who won the New Zealand Derby in 1992 and Cox Plate in 1993, earning over $2 million in his 44-race career.

Family

The Phantom Chance, a gelding by Noble Bijou out of The Fantasy, was a member of one of New Zealand's best-known Thoroughbred families bred by A.G, K.J., M.C., and P.R. Dennis (the Dennis brothers). This family features a number of horses whose names begin with 'The', including:

 The Pixie (1968, Mellay - The Kurd): 1981 Broodmare of the Year (who produced The Twinkle and The Fantasy).
 The Fantasy (1974, Gate Keeper - The Pixie): 1994 Broodmare of the Year.
 The Twinkle (1975, Gate Keeper - The Pixie).
 The Dimple (1977, Noble Bijou - The Pixie).
 The Phantom (1985, a full-brother to The Phantom Chance), winner of the 1990 Underwood Stakes and 1993 McKinnon Stakes.  
 The Grin (1992, Grosvenor - The Dimple): winner of the 1996 Southland Guineas and 2003 Broodmare of the Year.
 The Jewel (1999, O'Reilly - The Grin): winner of 11 races including the 2002 New Zealand 1000 Guineas, New Zealand International Stakes, Doomben Roses as well as runner-up in the New Zealand 2000 Guineas, New Zealand Oaks and Queensland Oaks.
 The Glitzy One (2007, Flying Spur - The Jewel): winner of 8 races.
 The Chosen One (2015, Savabeel - The Glitzy One): winner of the 2022 Thorndon Mile.

Racing career

The gelding didn't race at two and made a slow start to his three-year-old career, finishing third in his first two starts. But then he won eight races on end, six of them at stakes level, including the Derby and the Group 1 Cambridge Stud International Stakes against the older horses to confirm his status as New Zealand's champion three-year-old for the season.

His New Zealand Derby win gave trainer Colin Jillings his fifth win in the race, a number that no other trainer has matched.

As a four-year-old the horse's great success continued not only in New Zealand but also across the Tasman. He started his Australian career with a narrow win in the Turnbull Stakes at Flemington, and after a Group 1 placing at Caulfield became the second New Zealand Derby winner in three years (after Surfers Paradise) to win the Cox Plate, beating fellow New Zealander Solvit by a length and a half in the 1993 running of Australia's weight-for-age championship.
 
On 28 November 1993, ridden by Robert Vance, he placed 12th of 16 in the Japan Cup won by Legacy World. He was three places behind the Australian entrant, Naturalism.

He continued to race through to the age of 8, and occasionally experienced success in both New Zealand and Australia at stakes level. He wasn't the same horse as he was at three and four though, and as a result his record probably looks less impressive now than it should.

See also
 Thoroughbred racing in New Zealand

References

1989 racehorse births
Racehorses bred in New Zealand
Racehorses trained in New Zealand
Thoroughbred family 2-b